Santiago Civetta Ponce de Leon (born 28 February 1998) is a Uruguayan rugby union player who generally plays as a Flanker represents Uruguay internationally. He was included in the Uruguayan squad for the 2019 Rugby World Cup which was held in Japan for the first time and also marked his first World Cup appearance.

Career 
He made his international debut for Uruguay against Argentina XV in a World Cup warm-up match on 23 February 2019. He also works as rugby teacher at The British Schools of Montevideo

International tries 
As of 20 November 2021

References

External links

1998 births
Living people
Uruguayan rugby union players
Uruguay international rugby union players
Rugby union flankers
Rugby union players from Montevideo
Peñarol Rugby players
People educated at The British Schools of Montevideo